The Men's College National is a team handball tournament to determine the College National Champion from the US.

History
The best college team from the Men's National was claimed as College champion until 1996.
After the Olympic Games in 1996 in Atlanta the College Nationals were founded.

Record champion is the West Point with at minimum 34 titles the college has also the most continues titles with 13 from 2009 until now.

Results

Medal count

References

 Men's